Huañacagua (possibly from Aymara waña dry, q'awa little river, ditch, crevice, fissure, gap in the earth, "dry brook" or "dry ravine") is a mountain in the Chila mountain range in the Andes of Peru, about  high. It is situated in the Arequipa Region, Castilla Province, Chachas District. Huañacagua lies northwest of Chuañuma and southwest of  Aceruta.

References

Mountains of Peru
Mountains of Arequipa Region